Naris Pratumsuwan (born 1 April 1958) is a former Thai naval officer. He served as commander-in-chief of the Royal Thai Navy from 1 October 2017 to 30 September 2018. Luechai Rutdit was appointed as his successor.

References 

Living people
1958 births
Place of birth missing (living people)
Naris Pratumsuwan
Naris Pratumsuwan
Naris Pratumsuwan